Sandejan, also rendered as Sandegan or Sendegan, may refer to:
 Sandejan-e Olya
 Sandejan-e Sofla